Lithuanian Bishops' Conference is the official meeting of Catholic bishops in Lithuania. It has its seat in Vilnius. The Episcopal Conference is a member of the Council of European Episcopal Conferences (CCEE) and the Commission of the Bishops' Conferences of the European Community (COMECE).

Task and basics

The main task lies in the joint discussion on pastoral issues, to develop proposals and to coordinate church activities. Members of the Lithuanian Bishops' Conference, all diocesan bishops, bishops and auxiliary bishops and other titled (e.g. titular) bishops of the Republic of Lithuania. Currently belong to her nine active bishops and three retired bishops. The highest body is the Assembly of the Lithuanian bishops, they elect the president and his representatives for a three-year period.

Bureau

President: Gintaras Grušas, Archbishop of Vilnius

Deputies: Lionginas Virbalas, Archbishop of Kaunas

Structure
The Bishops' Conference works in the following structure: General Assembly, Permanent Council, Secretariat, commissions, and committees.

The annual General Assembly elects the Presidium and the Secretary-General to appoint commissions, committees and councils and appoints its chairman and members. It decides on matters of faith and discusses general issues of episcopal decrees and orders. It is empowered to proclaim official statements and is authorized to sign instructions.

The Permanent Council consists of the President and his deputy and the member elected Rimantas Norvila, Bishop of Vilkaviškis. The Council is elected every three years and prepare the questions and projects that will be addressed during the General Assembly and approved.

The Office of the Secretary General is currently carried out by Monsignor Kęstutis Smilgevičius; his side stands a staff of employees to coordinate the cooperation between the various bodies and institutions of the Episcopal Conference. The Secretariat will inform all members of the General Assembly on the decisions and changes. Simultaneously, the Secretariat is the connection point to other foreign bishops' conferences.

Commissions
The conference has following commissions:

Commission for training and education
Commission for Social Affairs
Commission on Liturgy and Religious Communities
Mass media

Committees
The Episcopal Conference may establish committees and appointed its head, this should be a bishop in the rule. Other experts and lay people might be appointed. The following committees are part of the conference:

Committee on Ecumenism
Committee on Family
Committee for Youth Affairs
Committee on the Laity
Committee for Links with the Polish Bishops' Conference
Committee on Social Affairs

See also
 Roman Catholicism in Lithuania

References

External links
 http://lvk.lcn.lt/en

Lithuania
Catholic Church in Lithuania